Cave of Archers is a rock art shelter of the Gilf Kebir National Park in the New Valley Governorate, Egypt. It is located on the south-eastern slopes of Gilf Kebir, 40 m to the south of the Cave of Swimmers.

Description
The south-west oriented entrance of the cave is 10 m wide and 5 m tall and opens into a large cupuliform formation modeled in the sandstone. The rock paintings of the cave feature a few panels of persons with bows and arrows as well as a herd of bovines. The paintings are dated between 6300 BP and 5500 BP during the African humid period, much different from the present hyper-arid one.

Due to bedrock deterioration the sandstone is heavily weathered or fragmented and only a few painted sandstone blocks remain.

References

Saharan rock art
New Valley Governorate
Caves of Egypt
Archaeological sites in Egypt